Garra Blanca (White Claw) is the title given to a barra brava that was created in Chile by the supporters of Santiago based football club Colo-Colo. It is one of the three largest and most important barras bravas in the country, the other beings Universidad de Chile's Los de Abajo (those from below) and Universidad Catolica "Los Cruzados" ("The Cruzaders").

History 
In early 1986 a youth movement gave rise among the various supporters of Colo-Colo imitating the Hooligans. Amid the military regime of Augusto Pinochet, marginalized members of Chilean society decided to unite and form a voice of identity. Over the years the group has been associated with widescale violence. Fighting with security personnel, the Chilean national police, and other team barra bravas is a common occurrence. Garra Blanca leaders are reported to have an unofficial relationship with Blanco y Negro, the corporate entity that is in charge of Colo-Colo. The board of directors deny such an alliance and have only stated that the barra brava is recognized for stadium safety reasons.

References 

1986 establishments in Chile
Association football culture
Chilean football supporters' associations
Ultras groups